St. George's Chapel is a historic Episcopal chapel located near Angola, Sussex County, Delaware on the Indian River Hundred.  It was built in 1794, and is a one-story brick structure measuring 42 feet by 32 feet. It has a brick tower at the southwest corner, built in 1955, and features a restored Palladian window.  The original furnishings were removed in 1850 and the roof replaced in 1882 with a steep gable roof.  The chapel was restored in 1966.  It is joined with All Saints Episcopal Church in the Episcopal Parish of All Saints’ Church & St. George's Chapel.

It was added to the National Register of Historic Places in 1973.

References

External links

 Episcopal Parish of All Saints’ Church & St. George’s Chapel

Episcopal church buildings in Delaware
Churches on the National Register of Historic Places in Delaware
Churches in Sussex County, Delaware
Churches completed in 1794
18th-century Episcopal church buildings
Buildings and structures in Lewes, Delaware
National Register of Historic Places in Sussex County, Delaware
1794 establishments in the United States
Episcopal chapels in the United States